Vanna Howard is an American politician from Massachusetts. Howard, a Democrat, was elected to Massachusetts House of Representatives in 2020. She defeated 11 term incumbent David Nangle in the Democratic primary. Nangle had faced a federal fraud scandal less than a year prior. She was born in Cambodia later emigrating to Massachusetts and is the second representative of Cambodian descent in the Massachusetts legislature along with Rady Mom, who is also from Lowell.

Committees
 Joint Committee on Cannabis Policy
 Joint Committee on Education
 Joint Committee on Public Health
 Joint Committee on Racial Equity, Civil Rights, and Inclusion

See also
 2021–2022 Massachusetts legislature

References

Year of birth missing (living people)
Living people
21st-century American politicians
American people of Cambodian descent
Asian-American people in Massachusetts politics
Cambodian emigrants to the United States
Democratic Party members of the Massachusetts House of Representatives
Politicians from Lowell, Massachusetts
Women state legislators in Massachusetts
21st-century American women politicians